Central Aérea Limitada was a Brazilian airline founded in 1948. In 1950 Central established a technical and operational partnership with Transportes Aéreos Nacional. Finally, in 1955 Central was sold to and incorporated by Nacional.

History
Central received its operational authorization on March 29, 1948 and flights started on June 11 of the same year. Its network linked Belo Horizonte to Rio de Janeiro and São Paulo, and cities in the state of São Paulo, and present states of Goiás, Mato Grosso and Mato Grosso do Sul. On August 26, 1950 Central established a technical-operational partnership with Transportes Aéreos Nacional but remained independent. However, in January 1955 Nacional bought all the shares of Central and incorporated the airline.

Destinations
In 1950 Central served the following cities:  
Belo Horizonte
Rio de Janeiro
São Paulo
and cities in the state of São Paulo, and in the present states of Goiás, Mato Grosso and Mato Grosso do Sul

Fleet

See also
List of defunct airlines of Brazil

References

External links
Central accidents as per Aviation Safety Database

Defunct airlines of Brazil
Airlines established in 1948
Airlines disestablished in 1955